Santhosh Aechikkanam is an Indian writer of Malayalam literature and a screenwriter in Malayalam cinema. He is known for his short stories, which include Komala and Biriyani. He also wrote screenplays for films such as Annayum Rasoolum and Bachelor Party.

Biography 
Santhosh Aechikkanam was born in 1971 in a farmer's family in Bedadka, in Kasargod district of the Indian state of Kerala to A. C. Chandran Nair and Shyamala. After graduating in Malayalam and literature, he secured a post graduate diploma in Journalism and mass communication from Kerala Press Academy. He has worked as a teacher at Durga Higher Secondary School, Kanhangad and was also associated with Akashvani.

Aechikkanam received the Kerala Sahitya Akademi Award for Story for his short story Komala (2008). He has also received several other honors, including Padmaprabha Literary Award, Karur Award, Pravasi Basheer Award, Abudhabi Sakthi Award, Cherukad Award, V. P. Sivakumar Keli Award, Kolkata Bhasha Sahithya Parishad Award, Delhi Katha Award and Kerala State Television Award for best story.

Aechikkanam, who has been involved in a controversy on his allegedly casteist remarks at a literary festival, is married to Jalsa Menon, who is a medical practitioner, and the couple has a son, Mahadevan. The family lives in Ayyanthole in Thrissur district.

Bibliography

Short story anthologies

Poems 
''Nanni'

Memoirs

Literary criticism

Filmography

References

Further reading

External links
 
 
 Komala by Santhosh Echikkanam

Living people
Malayali people
People from Kasaragod district
Screenwriters from Kerala
Indian male short story writers
Malayalam short story writers
Malayalam screenwriters
Recipients of the Kerala Sahitya Akademi Award
20th-century Indian short story writers
21st-century Indian short story writers
Indian male screenwriters
20th-century Indian male writers
21st-century Indian male writers
1971 births